The 2018 Danish Darts Open was the eighth of thirteen PDC European Tour events on the 2018 PDC Pro Tour. The tournament took place at Brøndbyhallen, Copenhagen, Denmark from 22–24 June 2018. It featured a field of 48 players and £135,000 in prize money, with £25,000 going to the winner.

Mensur Suljović won his second European Tour title, defeating Simon Whitlock 8–3 in the final.

This was the first PDC European Tour event to be held in Scandinavia.

Prize money
This is how the prize money is divided:

Prize money will count towards the PDC Order of Merit, the ProTour Order of Merit and the European Tour Order of Merit, with one exception: should a seeded player lose in the second round (last 32), their prize money will not count towards any Orders of Merit, although they still receive the full prize money payment.

Qualification and format 
The top 16 entrants from the PDC ProTour Order of Merit on 11 May will automatically qualify for the event and will be seeded in the second round.

The remaining 32 places will go to players from five qualifying events – 18 from the UK Qualifier (held in Milton Keynes on 18 May), eight from the West/South European Qualifier (held on 7 June), two from the Host Nation Qualifier (held on 21 June), two from the Nordic & Baltic Qualifier (excluding Danish players, held on 21 June), one from the East European Qualifier (held on 25 February), and one to the highest ranked PDCNB player on the PDC Order of Merit on 30 May.

The following players will take part in the tournament:

Top 16
  Michael van Gerwen (third round)
  Michael Smith (second round)
  Peter Wright (quarter-finals)
  Rob Cross (third round)
  Daryl Gurney (second round)
  Mensur Suljović (champion)
  Joe Cullen (quarter-finals)
  Jonny Clayton (second round)
  Ian White (second round)
  James Wade (third round)
  Darren Webster (third round)
  Simon Whitlock (runner-up)
  Mervyn King (quarter-finals)
  Gerwyn Price (third round)
  Stephen Bunting (third round)
  John Henderson (second round)

UK Qualifier
  Steve Beaton (second round)
  Paul Nicholson (first round)
  Adrian Lewis (semi-finals)
  Richard North (first round)
  Scott Taylor (second round)
  Ricky Evans (third round)
  Barry Lynn (second round)
  Steve West (semi-finals)
  Ted Evetts (first round)
  Chris Dobey (first round)
  Robert Thornton (first round)
  Mickey Mansell (first round)
  Peter Jacques (second round)
  Wayne Jones (first round)
  Brendan Dolan (quarter-finals)
  Ryan Joyce (second round)
  William O'Connor (first round)
  Adam Huckvale (first round)

West/South European Qualifier
  Jelle Klaasen (second round)
  Jermaine Wattimena (second round)
  Cristo Reyes (second round)
  Max Hopp (second round)
  Rusty-Jake Rodriguez (second round)
  Dragutin Horvat (first round)
  Martin Schindler (first round)
  Jeffrey de Zwaan (first round)

Host Nation Qualifier
  Per Laursen (first round)
  Brian Løkken (first round)

Nordic & Baltic Qualifier
  Dennis Nilsson (first round)
  Darius Labanauskas (third round)

Highest Ranked PDCNB Player on the PDC Order of Merit
  Madars Razma (second round)

East European Qualifier
  Krzysztof Ratajski (first round)

Draw

References

2018 PDC European Tour
2018 in Danish sport
International sports competitions in Copenhagen
June 2018 sports events in Europe
2018 in Copenhagen